Saerlaith inion Elcomach was an Irish centenarian who died in 969.

Saerlaith is recorded in the Annals of Ulster, sub anno 969, which states "Saerlaith, daughter of Elcomach, died aged one hundred."

See also

 Katherine Plunket, 1820–1932.
 Dan Keating, 1902–2007.

External links
 http://www.ucc.ie/celt/published/T100001A/index.html

10th-century Irish women
Irish centenarians
10th-century Irish people
Women centenarians